Anthony Le Gall (born March 7, 1985) is a French footballer currently playing for Angoulême CFC in Division Honneur (6th division).

Career

Europe
Le Gall was a member of the youth setup at AC Le Havre, and later with Brest, before signing his first professional contract with Brest in 2007. He made 24 appearances, and scored 2 goals, for Brest in his three years with the club, before moving to Canada.

Canada
In the summer of 2010 Le Gall signed with the Montreal Impact of USSF Division 2 Professional League, along with his compatriot Richard Pelletier. He made his debut for Impact on August 21, 2010, in a 5–0 win over Crystal Palace Baltimore, and scored his first goal for his new team on October 3, in a 2–0 win over the Austin Aztex on the last day of the 2010 USSFD2 regular season.

Career stats

References

1985 births
Living people
French footballers
Ligue 2 players
Stade Brestois 29 players
Montreal Impact (1992–2011) players
USSF Division 2 Professional League players
North American Soccer League players
Expatriate soccer players in Canada
US Concarneau players
Association football forwards
French expatriate footballers
French expatriate sportspeople in Canada
Sportspeople from Finistère
Footballers from Brittany
Brittany international footballers